Leigh Wardell-Johnson (born 17 March 1970) is an Australian rules footballer who played for the Fremantle Dockers in 1995. He was drafted from Claremont in the WAFL as a foundation selection in the 1994 AFL Draft and played as a half-forward.

External links

1970 births
Fremantle Football Club players
Claremont Football Club players
Living people
Australian rules footballers from Western Australia